Dehdaran-e Olya (also Romanized as Dehdārān-e ‘Olyā and Dehdaran ‘Olya; also known as Dehdārān and Dehdārān-e Bālā) is a village in Shabankareh Rural District, Shabankareh District, Dashtestan County, Bushehr Province, Iran. At the 2006 census, its population was 285, in 51 families.

References 

Populated places in Dashtestan County